A placebo effect is the tendency of any medication or treatment, even an inert or ineffective one, to exhibit results simply because the recipient believes that it will work.

Placebo effect may also refer to:
 "The Placebo Effect", an episode of the science fiction television series 2002 revival of The Twilight Zone
 Placebo Effect (band), German dark electro band
 Placebo Effect (film), a 1998 American thriller film 
 Placebo Effect (novel), a 1998 novel by Gary Russell, based on the British science fiction television series Doctor Who
 "Placebo Effect", a song by Siouxsie and the Banshees on the 1979 album Join Hands